Gortaloughan Halt railway station served Gortaloughan in  County Fermanagh in Northern Ireland.

The Great Northern Railway (Ireland)  opened the station on 23 September 1940.

It closed on 1 October 1957.

Routes

References

Disused railway stations in County Fermanagh
Railway stations opened in 1940
Railway stations closed in 1957
Railway stations in Northern Ireland opened in the 20th century